Quitman is a city in Clarke County, Mississippi, United States, along the Chickasawhay River. The population was 2,323 at the 2010 census. Quitman is the county seat of Clarke County.

History
Quitman was established in 1839 and named as the county seat.

During the Civil War, a hospital built with funds raised in Galveston and Houston, among other places, was built there for the care of Confederate soldiers from Texas. Originally staffed by Louis Bryan with supplies purchased in Mexico, he was joined, and later supplanted, by Enos Bonney, a surgeon from Enterprise, Mississippi, who stayed until the hospital was burned down.  Though it cared for troops from any state, the hospital was colloquially known as "The Texas Hospital."  Wounded soldiers from the Second Battle of Corinth, Battle of Iuka, Battle of Jackson, Tennessee, and more local engagements, as well as those suffering from wartime diseases, were treated at the hospital. A cemetery was established adjacent to the hospital for those who succumbed to disease or wounds.

During General Sherman's Meridian Campaign, Brigadier General Walter Q. Gresham, Commander of the Third Brigade, Fourth Division, 17th Army Corps, was detached and sent to Quitman to destroy bridges crossing the Chickasawhay river and through Alligator Swamp, as well as any other infrastructure that could be of any use to the Confederacy. The force arrived at Quitman and proceeded to burn the town jail, courthouse, various stores, the railroad depot, and the Methodist Church, which was being used as a hospital.  Troops then burned down the entire Texas Hospital complex, which included two main buildings as well as twelve to fifteen barracks. The hospital was never rebuilt.

Quitman was officially recognized by the Mississippi Legislature on February 13, 1839, and was named for the second Chancellor of the State, Gen. John A. Quitman, a strongly pro-slavery politician, leading Fire Eater, veteran of the Mexican–American War.

Geography
Quitman is located near the center of Clarke County. Mississippi Highway 18 passes through the center of the city.

Climate

Demographics

2020 census

As of the 2020 United States Census, there were 2,061 people, 897 households, and 619 families residing in the city.

2000 census
As of the census of 2000, there were 2,463 people, 975 households, and 674 families residing in the city. The population density was 475.9 people per square mile (183.6/km2). There were 1,097 housing units at an average density of 212.0 per square mile (81.8/km2). The racial makeup of the city was 45.26% White, 53.25% African American, 0.08% Native American, 0.04% Asian, 0.08% from other races, and 0.28% from two or more races. Hispanic or Latino of any race were 0.41% of the population.

There were 975 households, out of which 29.4% had children under the age of 18 living with them, 47.9% were married couples living together, 19.0% had a female householder with no husband present, and 30.8% were non-families. 28.6% of all households were made up of individuals, and 12.3% had someone living alone who was 65 years of age or older. The average household size was 2.37 and the average family size was 2.87.

In the city, the population was spread out, with 24.4% under the age of 18, 7.8% from 18 to 24, 22.9% from 25 to 44, 22.5% from 45 to 64, and 22.5% who were 65 years of age or older. The median age was 41 years. For every 100 females, there were 80.8 males. For every 100 females age 18 and over, there were 75.4 males.

The median income for a household in the city was $30,469, and the median income for a family was $38,311. Males had a median income of $28,250 versus $21,833 for females. The per capita income for the city was $14,789. About 16.9% of families and 23.3% of the population were below the poverty line, including 41.2% of those under age 18 and 9.7% of those age 65 or over.

Education
The city is served by the Quitman School District.

Notable people
 Andy Blakeney, jazz trumpeter
 Wyatt Emory Cooper, writer
 Oscar W. Gillespie, U.S. Representative for the state of Texas
 Dustin J. Lee, Corporal in the United States Marine Corps who was killed in Fallujah, Iraq
 Sam C. Massingale, American politician and a U.S. Representative from Oklahoma
 Kelly McCarty, former NBA player
 Antonio McDyess, former NBA power forward 
 Tarvarius Moore, NFL defensive back
 Homer Smith, Jr, journalist
 Samuel H. Terral, Justice of the Mississippi Supreme Court from 1897 to 1903
 James Yates (activist), labor organizer, political activist, and veteran of the Spanish Civil War

See also
Quitman Depot

References

Cities in Mississippi
Cities in Clarke County, Mississippi
County seats in Mississippi
Cities in Meridian micropolitan area